Doxocopa linda, or Linda's emperor, is a species of Neotropical butterfly in the family Nymphalidae and subfamily Apaturinae. It was described by Cajetan Felder and Rudolf Felder in 1862. It is found in Peru, Ecuador and the Brazilian state of Amazonas.

Subspecies
Doxocopa linda linda (Peru, Ecuador, Brazil: Amazonas)
Doxocopa linda mileta (Boisduval, 1870) (Paraguay, Brazil: Santa Catarina, Rio Grande do Sul, Espírito Santo, Minas Gerais, Rio de Janeiro, São Paulo)
Doxocopa linda plesaurina (Butler & H. Druce, 1872) (Costa Rica, Panama)
Doxocopa linda godmani (Dannatt, 1904) (Venezuela)
Doxocopa linda carwa Lamas, 1999 (Peru)

References

Apaturinae
Nymphalidae of South America
Butterflies described in 1862